The Elgar Sisters was an Icelandic duo formed by singer Björk Guðmundsdóttir and composer Guðlaugur Kristinn Óttarsson in 1984. The Elgar Sisters coexisted with Kukl, another group they were part of.

The origin of the duo’s name dates back to the recording sessions when engineer Mel Jefferson named the duo after English composer Edward Elgar.
From 1984 to 1986 the duo recorded 3 songs at Hjóðriti and 8 songs at Grettisgat studios (which later turned into Sýrland) which are known as The Elgar Sessions.

Nine songs were composed by Guðlaugur, one by Björk and one by the band. Besides Guðlaugur on electric and acoustic guitars and Björk as vocalist, some of the songs featured other musicians: Sigtryggur Baldursson (drums), Birgir Mogensen (bass), Einar Arnaldur Melax (keyboards), Hilmar Örn Hilmarsson (keyboards, percussion), and Þorsteinn Magnússon (guitars).
Some of the lyrics were taken from Dauðaljóðin (The Death Poems), a poetry book written by guitarist Þór Eldon Jónsson.

With the break-up of Kukl by mid 1986, the Elgar Sisters project was suspended, or up until the solo careers of Björk and Guðlaugur commenced.

Recorded songs

Track notes:
1: Renamed as “Mass” when it was performed by KUKL in 1985 with Einar Örn.
2: Also known as “Zontal” when rerecorded in 2005 for the Dense Time album.

Alternate versions
”Sue”, with drums.
”Síðasta Ég”, with drums and no vocals.

Featured On
1993 - Big Time Sensuality (One Little Indian), single by Björk.
1993 - Venus as a Boy (One Little Indian), single by Björk.
2002 - Family Tree (One Little Indian), CD box by Björk.
2005 - Dense Time (Academy of Industry and Arts), album by Guðlaugur K. Óttarsson.

External links
Björk.com
Official site of Guðlaugur Kristinn Óttarsson
GKO's music at Soundcloud
Official site of Einar Melax

Mel Jefferson's website

Björk
Icelandic alternative rock groups